One New Change is a major office and retail development in the City of London. It cost £500 million to build and was completed in October 2010.

The complex is located on New Change, a road linking Cannon Street with Cheapside, in one of the areas of the City historically associated with retailing and markets. It is close to St Paul's Cathedral. The nearest London Underground stations are St Paul's and Mansion House.

History and background 

The development's sensitive location – opposite St Paul's Cathedral – and its modern architecture led to some controversy during its planning and construction, including criticism from Prince Charles. The architect was Jean Nouvel and the developer was Land Securities. The new eight-storey, 34 m high centre replaced an 11-storey, 40 m building constructed in the 1950s for the Bank of England, which was demolished in 2007. The complex's distinctive appearance has given it the nickname "the stealth bomber".

One New Change opened its doors to the public at midday on 28 October 2010. The roof terrace, with its restaurant and cafe, was opened on 18 November 2010.

Location 

One New Change lies entirely within Bread Street ward. Its name derives from the road running between it and St Paul's, itself a post-War creation, replacing a much older street called Old Change. It is bounded by Cheapside to the north, Bread Street to the east, Watling Street to the south, and New Change to the west. Within the centre, the north–south arcade is called Cheapside Passage and the east–west arcade is New Change Passage.

The shopping centre is located in an area of London's historic nucleus that was widely known for its retail – 'Cheapside' being Old English for "market-place" – and many of the roads around One New Change are named after the produce once sold in the area, such as Poultry, Honey Lane, Milk Street and Bread Street.

Design 

The principal architect for the One New Change development was the French architect Jean Nouvel. The development also features high-profile interiors by Tom Dixon for the on-site restaurant Barbecoa, which was replaced by Ivy Asia in November 2019.

Tenants 

Sixty shops and restaurants are located in One New Change, including a number of large high-street retailers. A barbecue restaurant and butcher called Barbecoa was a joint-venture by Jamie Oliver and Adam Perry-Lang. It was replaced by Ivy Asia in November 2019.

The shopping centre is open seven days a week, which is notable as in recent times most shops and restaurants in the City have been closed at the weekends. A Gordon Ramsay restaurant and bar named Bread Street Kitchen opened at One New Change in September 2011.

References

External links 

Tourist attractions in the City of London
Buildings and structures in the City of London
Economy of the City of London
Shopping malls established in 2010
Shopping centres in the City of London
Retail buildings in London
Jean Nouvel buildings
2010 establishments in England